The third Khelo India Youth Games was held from 10 January 2020 and 22 January 2020 in Guwahati, Assam, India.
  The event witnessed 20 national level multidisciplinary grassroots games to get played among the age groups of under-17 and under-21 categories. Maharashtra defended its title as they topped the medal tally with 78 Gold medals, 77 Silver medals and 101 Bronze medals. The winning contingent of Maharashtra also broke their previous record of total medal haul of 228 medals created at Pune, by winning a total of 256 medals.
The event is held in 20 disciplines with the participation of 37 states and Union Territories.
Khelo India programme's inaugural edition was held in New Delhi in 2018, while Pune hosted 2nd edition in 2019.

Every year best performing 1000 participants are given an annual scholarship of Rs  for 8 years to prepare them for international sporting events.

Sports events
There are 20 sports disciplines in Khelo India Youth Games 2020. Cycling and Lawn Bowls are the new additional games of this year's event.

Medals tally

The final medal tally of the 3rd edition of Khelo India Youth Games is listed below. The host state, Assam, is highlighted.

References

Multi-sport events in India
Khelo India
2020 in youth sport
2020 in Indian sport